Jack Hartman (October 7, 1925 – November 6, 1998) was an American gridiron football player and basketball coach.

Hartman played basketball and football collegiately at Oklahoma State University with his basketball tutelage under famed coach Henry Iba.  After college, he played quarterback in the CFL before becoming a basketball coach.  After leading the Coffeyville (Kansas) Junior College basketball team to the NJCAA National Championship with a 32–0 season in 1962, he took his high-octane offense to Southern Illinois University, replacing the successful Harry Gallatin, who had taken the head coaching job with the St. Louis Hawks. In 1967, passing up the NCAA Division II tournament after two successive second-place finishes, Hartman's Salukis won the NIT Championship, which was much more highly regarded then than it is today. He led Southern Illinois University into Division I before taking over at Kansas State when Cotton Fitzsimmons left to coach in the NBA.

Hartman spent 16 seasons as head coach at Kansas State University, where he won 294 games and finished in first or second place in the Big Eight Conference in 10 of those 16 seasons.  After his retirement, he worked local television color commentary for Kansas State games, and his former player and assistant coach Lon Kruger took over as head coach at Kansas State.

Hartman is credited for introducing a unique two-tone uniform for Kansas State to wear during away games – lavender tops and purple shorts, which the Wildcats used from 1973–1982. During that stretch, KSU posted a record of 186–81 (.697), appeared in five NCAA Tournaments, and won the 1977 and 1980 Big Eight postseason tournaments. Lavender jerseys have since been associated with success at Kansas State, and the school has brought back lavender jerseys on certain occasions as a throwback uniform.

In 1996, when Kansas State fired its women's coach for NCAA violations, Hartman came out of retirement to coach the team for its last seven games, winning three.

Coach Hartman was inducted into the Southern Illinois University Hall of Fame in 1986, Kansas State University Hall of Fame in 1990, State of Kansas Sports Hall of Fame in 1990, and National Junior College Hall of Fame in 1991.

Hartman died in 1998. He has a street near Bramlage Coliseum named "Jack Hartman Drive" after him.  His wife, Pat, lived in Manhattan, Kansas until her death in 2020.  His daughter, Jackie, also lives in Manhattan and served as the Chief of Staff for the President of Kansas State University.

Head coaching record

Men's college basketball

*1976–77 record reflects one win by forfeit over Minnesota.

Women's college basketball

References

1925 births
1998 deaths
American men's basketball players
American women's basketball coaches
American football quarterbacks
American players of Canadian football
Basketball coaches from Oklahoma
Basketball players from Oklahoma
Canadian football quarterbacks
College men's basketball head coaches in the United States
Junior college men's basketball coaches in the United States
Kansas State Wildcats men's basketball coaches
Kansas State Wildcats women's basketball coaches
Oklahoma State Cowboys basketball players
Oklahoma State Cowboys football players
People from Dewey, Oklahoma
Players of American football from Oklahoma
Saskatchewan Roughriders players
Southern Illinois Salukis men's basketball coaches